A Gentleman's Club is a British television sitcom broadcast in the UK on BBC2 between September–October 1988.

Set in the fictional Albany Club in London, the series dealt with the changes afoot when the club was forced to move with the times and admit women.

Cast

Aubrey - William Gaunt
George - Richard Vernon
Ann – Jill Meager
Willie – Christopher Benjamin
Jim – Tim Barker
Lord Costwold – Jerome Willis
Quentin – Rupert Frazer

Episodes

References

External links
 

BBC television sitcoms
1980s British sitcoms
1988 British television series debuts
1988 British television series endings
English-language television shows